Idaho Legislative District 2 is one of 35 districts of the Idaho Legislature. It is currently represented by State representative  Steve Vick, Republican from Dalton Gardens, Vito Barbieri, Republican from Dalton Gardens, and Doug Okuniewicz Republican from Hayden.

Election 2020 
Legislative District 2 in Idaho has two seats for the state House of Representatives and one seat for the state Senate. Incumbent Republican state senator, Steve Vick was unopposed for the only senate seat for both the May primary and the November General election in 2020. Vito Barbieri won the election for House Seat A in the primary election, and he was also unopposed in the November general election. House Seat B incumbent Tim Remington did not run for reelection. Republican candidate Doug "Doug O" Okuniewicz won both the 2020 primary election and the general election for House Seat B.

Voter participation in the 2020 Idaho primary election was exclusively limited to absentee ballots. All polling locations were closed for the first time in the history of Idaho elections.

Party affiliation

District profile (1992–2002) 
From 1992 to 2002, District 2 consisted of a portion of Bonner and Kootenai Counties.

District profile (2002–2012) 
From 2002 to 2012, District 2 consisted of Benewah and Shoshone Counties and a portion of Bonner and Kootenai Counties.

District profile (2012–2022) 
District 2 currently consists of a portion of Kootenai County.

District profile (2022–) 
Beginning in December 2022, District 2 will consist of Benewah, Clearwater, and Shoshone Counties and a portion of Bonner and Kootenai Counties.

See also

 List of Idaho Senators
 List of Idaho State Representatives

References

External links
Idaho Legislative District Map (with members)
 Idaho General Election Results–November 8, 1994
 Idaho General Election Results–November 3, 1998

02
Kootenai County, Idaho